Pine Grove, Nova Scotia could be the following places:
 Pine Grove, Colchester, Nova Scotia in Colchester County
 Pine Grove, Lunenburg, Nova Scotia in Lunenburg County